Gangi is a comune (municipality) in the Metropolitan City of Palermo in the Italian region Sicily, located about  southeast of Palermo.

Gangi borders the following municipalities: Alimena, Blufi, Bompietro, Calascibetta, Enna, Geraci Siculo, Nicosia, Petralia Soprana, Sperlinga. The town straddles the Madonie mountains of central Sicily.

History

Gangi's origins have been connected to the ancient Greek city of Engyon, or Herbita, but this theory remains unconfirmed. Traces of Roman presence are instead testified by archaeological excavations under the Abbey of Gangivecchio ("Old Gangi"). (But according to Glenn Storey, Francesca Spatafora and other archeologists and a consolidated historiography, Engio was near Gangi (today c. da Alburchia or c. da Gangivecchio, in Gangi's territory).

The current settlement dates to 1300, when it was rebuilt on the Monte Marone after its destruction in the course of the Sicilian Vespers war, as part of the county of Geraci. In 1625 it was acquired by the Graffeo family who, four years later, were made Princes of Gangi; in 1677 the title went to the Valguarnera. In the 18th century Gangi was a flourishing cultural centre, with several literary clubs and the construction of notable noble residences.

Later, after the unification of Italy, Gangi was the centre of fierce suppression of brigands who lived in the area. In 1926 it was the location of one of the hardest repression of the Mafia in Italy, carried out by the local prefect Cesare Mori.

In 2014, the local administration under a dynamic mayor began disposing of abandoned houses with some being given away and others being sold for a nominal price.  The recipients had to agree to spend at least 35,000 euros on restoration within five years. The giveaway is a means to stimulate tourism-related activities and diversify the local economy, which was primarily dependent on agriculture and animal husbandry. The scheme has proved a great success.

Gangi and Di Gangi are also common Sicilian surnames.

Main sights

 The castle, on the highest part of Mount Marone, built probably in the 14th century. It was the seat of the county lords.
 Palazzo Sgadari and Palazzo Bongiorno, two notable noble residences
 Mother church of San Nicolò di Bari (14th century). Today it is connected to the large Ventimiglia tower, which has been turned into a campanile. It houses a Final Judgement by Giuseppe Salerno, several statues by the local sculptor Filippo Quattrocchi, 18th-century frescoes in the SS. Sacrament oratory and a crypt with mummies of priests.
 Sanctuary of the Spirito Santo
 Abbey of Gangivecchio (1366)
 The notable Romanesque church of  San Giuseppe dei Ricchi (also known as San Paolo)
 Late Baroque Chiesa della Badia
 Parish church of Santa Maria del Gesù, with a Romanesque campanile. It houses the precious sculptures of Madonna with Child and Annunciation by Quattrocchi.
 The Museum of Death, the Crypt of the Mummies of Gangi. The Museum features the Crypt of the Priests ("A Fossa di Parrini"), located in the basement of the San Nicolo church, where on display are one hundred standing mummified bodies of clergymen with their death masks in individual niches.  The Dutch artists, M.C. Escher, who lived for many years in Italy, after visiting the crypts in 1932, drew an artwork depicting these mummies entitled "Mummified Priests in Gangi, Sicily"; lithographs of this work exist today.

Gallery

References

External links
 Official website
 http://www.gangivecchio.org/home 
 Mario Siragusa, "La storia di Gangi", Bompietro-Locati, 2017: ; wiew: http://www.comitatoenginomadonita.altervista.org/CREM/

Municipalities of the Metropolitan City of Palermo
Castles in Italy
Populated places established in the 1300s
1300 establishments in Europe
13th-century establishments in the Kingdom of Sicily